Lee Sung-kyung (born August 10, 1990), is a South Korean model, singer and actress.

Film

Television series

Web series

Television shows

Web shows

Hosting

Music video appearances

References

External links
 

South Korean filmographies